Sulejmani is an Albanian and Gorani surname. Notable people with the surname include:

Alban Sulejmani (born 1998), Macedonian footballer
Erkan Sulejmani (born 1981), Albanian footballer
Miralem Sulejmani (born 1988), Serbian footballer
Skumbim Sulejmani (born 1986), Albanian-Swiss footballer
Valmir Sulejmani (born 1996), German footballer

See also 
 Soleymani (disambiguation)

Albanian-language surnames
Patronymic surnames
Surnames from given names